Sir Henry Gough, 1st Baronet (1709–1774), also known as Sir Harry Gough, of Edgbaston Hall, Warwickshire, was a British merchant and politician who sat in the House of Commons from 1732 to 1741.

Early life
Gough was the son of Sir Richard Gough of Edgbaston Hall, Warwickshire, and Gough House, Chelsea, and his wife Ann Crisp, daughter of Nicholas Crisp of Chiswick, Middlesex. He was admitted at Corpus Christi College, Cambridge and at Inner Temple in 1725. He became a merchant in the East India Company. He succeeded his father who died on 9 February 1728, and was created a baronet, of Edgbaston on 6 April 1728. Soon after succeeding his father he bought two more burgages at Bramber, a rotten borough, giving him full control of the seat, for which he thenceforth could nominate both Members. He married Catherine Harpur, daughter of Sir John Harpur, 4th Baronet, of Calke, Derbyshire.

Career
Gough was returned as Member of Parliament for Totnes on the government interest at a by-election on 25 January 1732. He supported the Government and voted for the excise bill. At the 1734 British general election he returned himself as MP for Bramber with his cousin Harry Gough. He continued to vote with the Government and retired at the 1741 British general election.

Gough's first wife Catherine died on 22 June 1740 and he married, as his second wife, Barbara Calthorpe (c. 1716 – 1782), on 2 July 1741. She was the heiress of Reynolds Calthorpe of Elvetham, Hampshire.

Death and legacy
Gough died on 8 June 1774 leaving six children by his second wife. He was succeeded in the baronetcy by his son Henry, who became Henry Gough-Calthorpe upon his inheritance of his maternal uncle's lands in 1788 and was created 1st Baron Calthorpe in 1796.

Gough also had two daughters, Barbara and Charlotte Gough, also known as Gough-Calthorpe. The former (c. 1745 – 1826) married in 1770 Isaac Spooner, a wealthy Birmingham businessman, and bore ten children, including Barbara Spooner, who married abolitionist William Wilberforce, and Anne Spooner (1780–1873), who married in 1809 The Rev. Edward Vansittart Neale, Rector of Taplow in Buckinghamshire, and had eight children, including Edward Vansittart Neale, one of the Founders of the Co-Operative Society, and Charlotte Vansittart Neale (1817–1881), married in 1841 to Charles Frere, a barrister and parliamentary clerk, by whom she had nine children, one of which, Charlotte Vansittart Frere (1846–1916), married in 1882 artist and writer A. G. Folliott-Stokes of St Ives, author of several important books on Cornwall, and had issue. The latter married Sir John Palmer, 5th Baronet, who was MP for Leicestershire from 1765 to 1780.

See also
 Gough-Calthorpe family

References

1709 births
1774 deaths
Baronets in the Baronetage of Great Britain
Members of the Parliament of Great Britain for Totnes
British MPs 1727–1734
British MPs 1734–1741
Gough-Calthorpe family